Usher is an American singer-songwriter, actor, and dancer. He has received multiple awards and nominations for his work in music and film. His awards are predominantly in R&B, Pop, and hip-hop genre categories.

Throughout the course of his career, Usher has won eight Grammy awards, 35 ASCAP Awards, 18 Billboard Music Awards, 14 BMI Awards, nine Soul Train Music Awards, and eight American Music Awards. For his contributions to music, Usher has received a Musical Arts Award at The BET Honors, a Golden Note award at the ASCAP Awards, and inductions into the Georgia Music Hall of Fame and Hollywood Walk of Fame. Outside of music, he's received accolades such as the Freedom Award and President's Volunteer Service Award for his charitable efforts, and an NBA Championship with the Cleveland Cavaliers via part ownership. According to Fuse in 2014, Usher is the 10th most awarded recording artist of all time. Overall, Usher has won 339 awards from 633 nominations.

His sophomore studio album My Way  (1997) earned Grammy Award nominations for "You Make Me Wanna" and "My Way" as Best Male R&B Vocal performance. He received his first MTV Video Music Award nomination as Best R&B Video for the former and won three Billboard Music Awards including Top Artist in 1998. He also received an NAACP Image Award nomination as Outstanding Actor in a Daytime Drama Series for his appearance on the soap opera The Bold and the Beautiful in 1999. His third studio album, 8701 (2001) generated the singles "U Remind Me", "U Got It Bad", and "U Don't Have to Call". He won his first two Grammy Awards as Best Male R&B Vocal Performance.

His fourth studio album, Confessions (2004) received the most nominations at the 2004 Billboard Music Awards, with 21. He took home 14, including Top Billboard 200 Album, Hot 100 Artist of the Year, Artist of the Year. In 2005, he won the Sammy Davis Jr. Award for Entertainer of the Year and was named Man of the Year at the Glamour Awards. At the 48th Annual Grammy Awards, he won Best Contemporary R&B Album, Best Rap/Sung Collaboration, and Best R&B Performance by a Duo or Group with Vocals.

His fifth studio album, Here I Stand  (2008) produced title track "Here I Stand" was nominated for the Best Male R&B Vocal Performance award at the 51st Grammy Awards. Raymond v. Raymond (2010) produced "OMG" which won Top R&B Song and also received Best Contemporary R&B Album and Best Male R&B Vocal Performance for "There Goes My Baby", which set a Guinness World Record. Usher won Favorite Soul/R&B Male Artist at the AMAs and International Male Artists Of The Year at the NRJ Music Awards in 2011. Looking 4 Myself  produced "Climax" won Best R&B Performance in 2013.

ADC Awards
The ADC is the first global organization to celebrate and award leaders in creative communications. The ADC Annual Awards, part of The One Club for Creativity, is the oldest continuously running industry award show in the world. Usher has won one award.

AD Stars
Ad Stars is an international advertising festival.

American Music Awards
The American Music Awards is an annual awards ceremony created by Dick Clark in 1973.

ASCAP Awards
The ASCAP Awards are held annually by the American Society of Composers, Authors and Publishers.

ASCAP Latin Awards

ASCAP Pop Awards
The ASCAP Pop Music Awards honors the songwriters and publishers of the most performed pop songs.

BET Hip Hop Awards
The BET Hip Hop Awards are hosted annually by BET for hip hop performers, producers and music video directors.

The BET Honors
The BET Honors were established in 2008 by the Black Entertainment Television network to grace the lives and achievements of African-American luminaries. The awards will be presented annually and broadcast on BET during Black History Month.

Billboard Awards

Billboard All Time Chart Awards

Billboard Greatest Pop Star

Billboard Mid-Year Music Awards 

Voted online on Billboards official website, the Billboard Mid-Year Music Award honors artists and shows for their achievements in music in the first half of the year in the United States.

Billboard Music Awards
The Billboard Music Awards are sponsored by Billboard magazine and is held annually in December. The awards are based on sales data by Nielsen SoundScan and radio information by Nielsen Broadcast Data Systems.

Billboard R&B/Hip-Hop Awards
The Billboard R&B/Hip-Hop Awards reflect the performance of recordings on the Hot R&B/Hip-Hop Songs and Hot Rap Tracks.

Billboard Touring Awards

Billboard Video Music Awards

Latin Billboard Music Awards
The Billboard Latin Music Awards grew out of the Billboard Music Awards program from Billboard Magazine, an industry publication charting the sales and radio airplay success of musical recordings.

!
|-
| 2011 || Usher || Crossover Artist Of The Year || 
|style="text-align:center;"|
|-
|rowspan="4"| 2012 ||rowspan="4"| "Promise" (with Romeo Santos) || Song Of The Year, Vocal Event || 
|style="text-align:center;" rowspan="4"|
|-
| Tropical Song Of The Year || 
|-
| Digital Songs || 
|-
| Streaming Songs || 
|}

Billboard Year-End Chart Awards
The Billboard Year-End Chart Awards are published annually to honor the artists in many categories announced by Billboard both in the press and as part of their year-end issue.

Blockbuster Entertainment Awards
The Blockbuster Entertainment Awards was a film awards ceremony, founded by Blockbuster Inc., that ran from 1995 until 2001. The awards were produced by Ken Ehrlich every year.

Interactive Advertising Bureau
The Internet Advertising Bureau (IAB) UK is the industry body for digital advertising, committed to building a sustainable future for digital advertising. We do this by bringing the industry together through our 1,200 members including media owners, agencies and brands.

International Dance Music Awards
The Winter Music Conference was established in 1985. It is a part of the Winter Music Conference, a weeklong electronic music event held annually.

International Design Awards
The International Design Awards are a group of awards that recognize, celebrate and promote design visionaries and emerging talent in architecture, interior, product, graphic and fashion design.

Juno Awards
The Juno Awards are presented annually to Canadian musical artists and bands to acknowledge their artistic and technical achievements in all aspects of music. New members of the Canadian Music Hall of Fame are also inducted as part of the awards ceremonies.

Key to The City
The Key to The city is an honor given to valued member of the community, or upon a visiting celebrity or dignitary.

!
|-
|2008
|Usher
|Key to The City of New Orleans, Louisiana 
|
|style="text-align:center;"|

Kora Awards
The Kora Awards are music awards given annually for musical achievement in sub-Saharan Africa.

!
|-
|2004
|Usher
|Best Male Artist of Diaspora (USA)
|
|style="text-align:center;"|

Little Kids Rock
Little Kids Rock is an organization that partners with public school districts with the goal of ensuring that all students (K-12) have access to music education and its many benefits.

London International Awards
The London International Awards are a worldwide awards annually honoring excellence in advertising, digital media, production, design, music & sound and branded entertainment. It was the first international advertising award of its kind to acknowledge all media and methods from around the world to be judged by a diverse global jury

Make-A-Wish

Make-A-Wish is an organisation that arranges experiences described as "wishes" to children with life-threatening medical conditions. At its 2017 Wish Gala in Los Angeles, Usher was honored for his granting of 40 wishes to children through his long-time partnership.

Meteor Awards
A Meteor Ireland Music Award was an accolade bestowed upon professionals in the music industry in Ireland and further afield

MIXX Awards
The MIXX Awards recognize and showcase great European digital research projects and the contribution they have made to the development of the digital advertising industry.

Mnet Asian Music Awards
The Mnet Asian Music Awards is one of the major K-pop music awarding ceremonies held annually by CJ E&M through its music channel Mnet, involving the participation of some of the most well-known actors and celebrities, not only in South Korea, but also in other countries such as China (including Taiwan and Hong Kong), Japan, Indonesia, Canada, Singapore and United States.

Morehouse College
Morehouse College is a private, all-male, liberal arts, historically African American college located in Atlanta, Georgia. Its annual "A Candle in the Dark" Gala presents the Candle Award in honor of excellence in the arts, athletics, business, education, entertainment, government, law, medicine, the military, religion, and science and technology.

Music of Black Origin Awards, UK (MOBO)
The MOBO Awards (an acronym for Music of Black Origin) were established in 1996 by Kanya King. They are held annually in the United Kingdom to recognize artists of any race or nationality performing music of black origin.

MTV Awards

MTV Asia Awards

MTV Australia Video Music Awards

MTV Europe Music Awards
The MTV Europe Music Awards (EMA) were established in 1994 by MTV Networks Europe to celebrate the most popular music videos in Europe.

MTV Platinum Video Plays Awards

MTV Video Music Awards
The MTV Video Music Awards were established in 1984 by MTV to celebrate the top music videos of the year.

MTV Video Music Awards Japan

TRL Awards

MuchMusic Video Awards
The MuchMusic Video Awards is an annual awards ceremony presented by the Canadian music video channel MuchMusic.

NAACP Image Awards
The NAACP Image Awards is an award presented annually by the American National Association for the Advancement of Colored People to honor outstanding people of color in film, television, music and literature.

Nantucket Film Festival
The Nantucket Film Festival is a film festival founded in 1996 which focuses on screenwriting.

National Civil Rights Museum
The Freedom Award established in 1991 is an annual event for the National Civil Rights Museum. The Freedom Award honors individuals who have made significant contributions in civil rights and who have laid the foundation for present and future leaders in the battle for human rights.

NBA
The NBA (National Basketball Association) is the pre-eminent men's professional basketball league in North America. As part owner of the Cleveland Cavaliers, Usher received credit to their win of the NBA Finals at the end of the 2015–16 season for being a part owner of the team
.

New York Festival
The New York Festival Advertising Award is an annual event for those working in advertising.

New York Film Critics Online
The New York Film Critics Online (NYFCO) is an organization founded by Harvey Karten in 2000 composed of Internet film critics based in New York City. The group meets once a year, in December, for voting on its annual NYFCO Awards.

Nickelodeon Kids' Choice Awards
The Nickelodeon Kids' Choice Awards were established in 1988 and is an annual awards show that honors the year's biggest television, film and music acts, as voted by the people who watch the Nickelodeon cable channel.

NRJ Music Awards (France)
A major award ceremony that takes place in Cannes, France.

One Club Show
The One Club is an awards show recognizing the best creative work in advertising, interactive, design and branded entertainment.

Ozone Awards
Ozone is an American magazine focused on the hip hop music of the Southern United States. The first annual Ozone Awards were held on August 6, 2006.

! 
|-
|2008
|"Love in This Club"
|Best Rap/R&B Collaboration
|
|style="text-align:center;"|
|}

Pensado Awards
The Dave Pensado Awards is an annual awards held in Los Angeles, California.

People Choice Awards, USA
The People's Choice Awards is an annual awards show recognizing the people and the work of popular culture.

Piaf Awards
The Piaf Awards is a part of an annual the festival every year in the spring.

Pitchfork Magazine

Premios Juventud
Premios Juventud  is an awards show for Spanish-speaking celebrities in the areas of film, music, sports, fashion, and pop culture, presented by the television network Univision.

President's Volunteer Service Award
The President's Volunteer Service Award is a civil award bestowed by the President of the United States. In 2017, Atlanta Mayor Kasim Reed presented Usher with the Points of Light President's Lifetime Achievement Service Volunteer Award, on behalf of President Barack Obama, for his work with his foundation, Usher's New Look since 1999.

PTTOW!
PTTOW! is an invite-only community and summit for today's most creative and inspiring CEOs, CMOs and Icons, spanning 70 major industries. Usher received an Icon award at the 2017 summit.

Radio Disney Music Awards
The Radio Disney Music Awards is an annual awards show which is operated and governed by Radio Disney, an American radio network.

!
|-
|2004
|Usher
|Best Male Artist
|
|style="text-align:center;"|
|}

Radio Music Awards, USA
Radio Music Awards is an annual U.S. award show that honored the year's most successful songs on mainstream radio. Nominations were based on the amount of airplay recording artists receive on radio stations in various formats using chart information compiled by Mediabase.

Recording Academy
The Recording Academy is a U.S. organization of musicians, producers, recording engineers and other recording professionals. The Atlanta chapter of the academy presents honours annually.

Record of the Year Awards
The Record of the Year Awards was an award voted by the UK public. For many years it was given in conjunction with television programmes of the same name.

RTHK International Pop Poll Awards
The RTHK International Pop Poll Awards is an annual award show in Hong Kong that honors the best in international and national music.

Saturn Awards
The Saturn Award is an American award presented annually by the Academy of Science Fiction, Fantasy and Horror Films; it was initially created to honor science fiction, fantasy, and horror on film, but has since grown to reward other films belonging to genre fiction, as well as on television and home media releases.

SESAC Pop Awards
SESAC Pop Awards honors its members in an annual awards shows.

Smash Hits Poll Winners Party
The Smash Hits Poll Winners Party was an awards ceremony which ran from 1979 (as the Smash Hits Readers' Poll) to 2005. Each award winner was voted by readers of the Smash Hits magazine.

Southern Museum of Music
The Southern Museum of Music was established to honor and preserve the contributions of musicians whose roots originated in the southern United States.

Soul Train Music Awards, USA
The Soul Train Music Awards is an annual award show aired in national broadcast syndication that honors the best in African American music and entertainment established in 1987.

Sundance Film Festival
The Sundance Film Festival is the largest annual independent film festival in the United States.

Teen Choice Awards 
The Teen Choice Awards is an annual awards show that airs on the Fox television network. The awards honor the year's biggest achievements in music, film, sports, television, fashion, and more, voted by viewers aged 11 to 20.

!
|-
|rowspan="2"|1999
| "Nice & Slow"
| Single of the Year
| 
|style="text-align:center;"|
|-
|She's All That
| Choice Movie: Comedy
|
|style="text-align:center;" rowspan="1"|
|-
| 2001
| "U Remind Me"
| Choice Summer Song
| 
|style="text-align:center;"|
|-
|rowspan="7"|2002
|8701
| Choice Album
|
|style="text-align:center;" rowspan="6"|
|-
|"U Got It Bad"
|Choice Love Song 
|
|-
|"U Don't Have To Call"
|Choice Single
|
|-
| "I Need a Girl (Part One)" (with Diddy & Loon)
| Choice Hook Up
| 
|-
|rowspan="6"| Usher
|Choice R&B/Hip-Hop/Rap Artist 
|
|-
|Choice Male Artist 
|
|-
|rowspan="2"|Choice Male Hottie
|
|style="text-align:center;"|
|-
|rowspan="3"|2003
|
|style="text-align:center;" rowspan="3"|
|-
|Choice R&B/Hip-Hop/Rap Artist
|
|-
|Choice Male Fashion icon
|
|-
|rowspan="4"|2004
|rowspan="2"|"Yeah!"
|Choice R&B track
|
|style="text-align:center;" rowspan="4"|
|-
| Choice Best hook-up
|
|-
|rowspan="1"| Confessions
|Choice Album
|
|-
|rowspan="4"| Usher
|rowspan="2"|Choice R&B Artist
|
|-
|rowspan="6"|2005
|
|style="text-align:center;" rowspan="6"|
|-
|Choice Male Hottie
|
|-
|Choice Red Carpet Fashion Icon - Male
|
|-
| rowspan="2"| "Caught Up"
| Choice Music: R&B/Hip-Hop Track
| 
|-
| Choice Music: Party Starter
| 
|-
| "Lovers and Friends" (with Lil Jon & Ludacris)
| Choice Music: Rap Track
| 
|-
|rowspan="2"|2008
|rowspan="4"|Usher
|Choice R&B Artist
|
|style="text-align:center;" rowspan="2"|
|-
|rowspan="2"|Choice Male Artist
|
|-
|rowspan="4"|2010
|
|style="text-align:center;" rowspan="2"|
|-
|Choice R&B Artist
|
|-
|Raymond v. Raymond
|Choice R&B Album
|
|style="text-align:center;"|
|-
|"OMG"
|Choice R&B track
|
|style="text-align:center;"|
|-
|rowspan="4"|2012
|Usher
|Choice Summer Music Star: Male 
|
|style="text-align:center;" rowspan="3"|
|-
|"Climax"
|Choice Break-Up Song
|
|-
|"Scream"
|Choice Summer Song
|
|-
|"Without You"
|Choice R&B/Hip-hop Song
|
|style="text-align:center;|

Telecom Mobile Music Awards
The Telecom Mobile Music Awards New Zealand were presented to international and local record labels for the top 20 songs that Telecom mobile users have downloaded as either a ringtone or caller tune starting 2005.

Time Magazine

The Source Music Awards

TMF Awards (Netherlands)
The TMF Awards were annual public prices of TMF for musicians.

Vevo Certified Awards
Vevo Certified Award honors artists with over 100 million views on Vevo and its partners (including YouTube) through special features on the Vevo website. It was launched in June 2012.

VH1 Big in '04 Awards
VH1 Big in '04 was the 2004 annual award show that aired on December 1, 2004 in the United States.

Vibe Awards
Vibe magazine produced and aired its annual Vibe Awards show in 2003 on UPN until 2006. It was then aired on VH1 Soul in 2007.

!
|-
|rowspan="5"|2004
|rowspan="2"|Usher
|R&B Voice of the Year 
|
|style="text-align:center;"|
|-
|Artist of the Year 
|
|style="text-align:center;" rowspan="4"|
|-
|rowspan="2"|"Yeah!"
|Club-Banger of the Year
|
|-
|Coolest Collabo
|
|-
|"Confessions Part II"
|R&B Song of the Year
|

Washington West Award Film Festival
Washington West Award Film Festival is a film festival founded in 2011 by Brad Russell.

Webby Awards
The Webby Award are awards for excellence on the Internet presented annually by The International Academy of Digital Arts and Sciences, a judging body composed of over two thousand industry experts and technology innovators.

WPPed Cream
The WPPed Cream Awards were initiated in 2007 to recognise the very best work produced by WPP companies around the world, across all marketing disciplines.

World Music Awards
The World Music Awards were established in 1989 and is an international awards show that annually honors musicians based on their worldwide sales figures, which are provided by the International Federation of the Phonographic Industry.

! 
|-
|rowspan="3"|2004
|rowspan="10"|Usher
|World's Best Male Artist
|
|style="text-align:center;" rowspan="3"|
|-
|World's Best Pop Male Artist
|
|-
|World's Best R&B Male Artist
|
|-
|rowspan="3"|2005
|World's Best Male Artist
|
|style="text-align:center;"|
|-
|World's Best Pop Male Artist
|
|style="text-align:center;" rowspan="2"|
|-
|rowspan="2"|World's Best Selling R&B Artist
|
|-
|2008
|
|style="text-align:center|
|-
|rowspan="6"| 2014
|World's Best Entertainer of the Year
|
|style="text-align:center;" rowspan="6"|
|-
|World's Best Male Artist
|
|-
|World's Best Live Act
|
|-
|Looking 4 Myself
|World's Best Album
|
|-
|rowspan="2"|"Scream"
|World's Best Song
|
|-
|World's Best Video
|
|}

Young Hollywood Awards
The Young Hollywood Awards is an award presented annually which honors the year's biggest achievements in pop music, movies, sports, television, fashion and more, as voted on by teenagers aged 13–19 and young adults.

! 
|-
|2001
|Usher
|One to Watch - Male
|
|style="text-align:center;"|
|}

References 

Awards
Usher